The Opel-Rennbahn 'Opel Racetrack'  is a former race track, which was built by the Adam Opel AG in 1919. It was located in a forest about two kilometers south of Rüsselsheim am Main at the Schönauer Hof and was Germany´s first purpose build racingtrack. The site is owned by the City of Mainz, which now operates a waterworks there.

Use from 1919 to 1946 
Due to its design as an oval track racing circuit, with a track width of twelve meters and its high, steep curves, it was considered one of the fastest racetracks in Europe in the 1920s. Average speeds of up to 140  km / h were possible. The Opel racetrack was used for public  bicycle, motorcycle and  car racing, and attracted up to 50,000 visitors at peak times. Among others, Jimmie Simpson, Guido Mentasti and Hermann Lang started here. It was also the test track of Adam Opel AG, which often tested new developments here, including the rocket car  Opel RAK.1. Due to the technical development in Motorsport as well as the opening of the AVUS, Nürburgring and the Hockenheimring, however, fewer and fewer racing events were held on the racetrack from 1930 onwards. After the end of World War II the site was temporarily used by the  US Army.

State since 1946 
Since 1946, the use of the Opel racetrack had been completely abandoned, but the facility was not demolished. In 1949 the lease with the city of Mainz expired. As a result, holes were made in the slope in order to plant trees there. In the 1960s, part of the home straight was demolished in order to facilitate the new construction of the L3012 state road. The slope is partly overgrown today, but it is still easy to see; in particular the steep wall curves are almost completely preserved. More recently, the historic complex has been integrated into the Rhein-Main Regional Park as an industrial heritage site. A small, accessible platform with information boards has been protruding into the north curve since 2013.

Weblinks 
 Automobil- und Technikgeschichte der Opel-Rennbahn by Werner Schollenberger, accessed on October 23, 2016.
 Die Opel-Rennbahn at www.ruesselsheim.de
 Kulturdenkmal OPEL-Rennbahn with the kind support of the Kulturdenkmal OPEL Rennbahn e. V., which is in the process of being founded in 2018/19

References 

Motorsport in Germany
Defunct motorsport venues in Germany